Thomas Wyatt Wilson Binford (April 6, 1924 – January 14, 1999) was an Indianapolis-based entrepreneur and philanthropist. One of Indianapolis' most influential men, Thomas W. Binford was a pioneer, visionary and civil rights leader. He participated in civic, philanthropic, cultural and political aspects of the city and state and was valued for his sensitivity, wise counsel, personal and financial support, and sincerity. In addition to his many personal interests, Binford spearheaded a group to buy the Indiana Pacers basketball team in 1975 and served as its president and general manager for one year. From 1974-1995, Binford served as the Chief Steward of the Indianapolis 500, presiding over its transition from United States Auto Club to Indy Racing League governance.

Biography
Binford attended Princeton University, where he was a member of Phi Beta Kappa.  He was interim president of DePauw University in 1975-76.  Although he did not have any prior banking experience, Binford was elected chairman and chief executive officer of Indiana National Corporation, the holding company for the largest bank in the state of Indiana, from 1976 to 1981, turning the company around after the company lost money during the 1973–75 recession.  He was instrumental in bringing the Colts to Indianapolis. His greatest contribution was creating an environment in the city of Indianapolis where issues of civil rights and race could be discussed productively and without rancor.  A street in northeastern Indianapolis was renamed Binford Boulevard in his honor.

Binford began serving as chief steward during the 1973 Indianapolis 500. His most notable races includes the 1981 Indianapolis 500 and the 1995 Indianapolis 500. Binford penalized Bobby Unser one lap for illegal passes under a caution in 1981. His penalty was overruled by a USAC appeals board 5 months later. In 1995 Binford penalized Jacques Villeneuve early in the race, for a restart violation & later gave a stop-and-go penalty for Scott Goodyear after Goodyear passed the pace-car on the final restart. The 1995 race was his last one as chief steward before retiring in 1996.

Binford suffered from a cerebral hemorrhage while he was at his office in Indianapolis and later died at Methodist Hospital. He is buried at Crown Hill Cemetery in Indianapolis.

References

External links
 Biography, The Auto Channel
 DePauw University profile, 1975
 DePauw University article, 2005

1924 births
1999 deaths
Princeton University alumni
Auto racing executives
Presidents of DePauw University
American bankers
American sports businesspeople
American motorsport people
American philanthropists
National Basketball Association executives
Businesspeople from Indianapolis
Burials at Crown Hill Cemetery
20th-century American businesspeople
Home Improvement (TV series)
Park Tudor School alumni